A top-level domain (TLD) is an apexial Internet domain name.

TLD may also refer to:

 Telefónica Larga Distancia, Telefónica's Puerto Rican telecomms subsidiary 
 Thermoluminescent dosimeter, a radioactivity measurement device
 Tuli Lodge Airport, an airport in Botswana, by IATA code
 The Living Daylights, a 1987 James Bond film
 :fr:TLD Group, a manufacturer of ground support equipment